Mike is a 1926 American silent comedy drama film directed by Marshall Neilan. The film is a modest production, featuring Sally O'Neil and William Haines.

Plot
As described in a film magazine review, "Mike," a young woman, lives with her two brothers, sister, and father in an old frieght car on a railroad siding in the desert. She enlists the aid of a circus manager from a nearby town to cure her father and his pal of drinking. Both swear off alcohol after seeing a vision of colored elephants and other beasts. Mike learns of a plot to hold up the Limited train. She and the children narrowly escape death when their frieght car is sent wildly down grade. She tells her sweetheart Harlan, a telegraphist, of the bandits' scheme. The authorities are notified and the outlaws are captured.

Cast
 Sally O'Neil as Mike (credited as Sally O'Neill)
 William Haines as Harlan
 Charles Murray as Father (credited as Charlie Murray)
 Ned Sparks as Slinky
 Ford Sterling as Tad
 Frankie Darro as Boy
 Frank Coghlan, Jr. as Boy (credited as Junior Coghlan)
 Muriel Frances Dana as Girl
 Sam De Grasse as Brush

References

External links

1926 films
1920s color films
1926 comedy-drama films
Metro-Goldwyn-Mayer films
American silent feature films
American black-and-white films
1920s English-language films
Films directed by Marshall Neilan
1920s American films
Silent American comedy-drama films